The 2014 Durango-Durango Emakumeen Saria was the thirteenth running of the Durango-Durango Emakumeen Saria, a women's bicycle race in Spain. It was rated by the UCI as a 1.2 category race.

Results

References

External links
 Official website 

2014 in Spanish road cycling
2014
2014 in women's road cycling
June 2014 sports events in Europe